Hoseynabad (also Romanized as Ḩoseynābād) is a village in Korond Rural District, in the Central District of Boshruyeh County, South Khorasan Province, Iran. At the 2006 census, its population was 41, in 8 families.

References 

Populated places in Boshruyeh County